The BET Award for Video Director of the Year is given to the best directors of music videos released in the same or previous year. The category was first created in 2008 and since its conception. The all-time winner in this category is Beyoncé with three wins. Benny Boom has received the most nominations with fourteen each.

Winners and nominees
Winners are listed first and highlighted in bold.

2000s

2010s

2020s

Multiple wins and nominations

Wins

 3 wins
 Beyoncé

 2 wins
 Benny Boom

Nominations

 14 nominations
 Benny Boom

 11 nominations
 Hype Williams

 6 nominations
 Director X

 5 nominations
 Chris Robinson

 4 nominations
 Beyoncé
 Chris Brown

 3 nominations
 Dave Meyers
 Gil Green

 2 nominations
 Bruno Mars
 Colin Tilley
 Kanye West

See also
 BET Award for Video of the Year

References

Awards established in 2008
BET Awards
American music video awards